The Bohumín arson attack took place on 8 August 2020 at an apartment building on Nerudova Street in the town of Bohumín, roughly 300 km north-east of Prague, Czech Republic. Police arrested 54-year-old arsonist Zdeněk Konopka in front of the building. The perpetrator, who had four prior criminal convictions, admitted to pouring 8 liters of gasoline into plastic bottles at a nearby petrol station and going to his son's flat. It was bustling with people who were celebrating a birthday party to which the perpetrator was not invited. He poured the gasoline in the hallway within the flat and then onto the entrance doors and set it ablaze. This led to the extremely fast spread of the fire throughout the flat with no escape route possible.

The fire on the 11th story of the 13-story building killed a total of six people. Four people managed to save themselves by climbing through balconies to a nearby flat. Five more people, all of them already on fire, jumped to their deaths out of a window from a room without a balcony. Casualties included three children. The perpetrator's son, grandson, soon-to-be daughter-in-law and estranged wife all died. The perpetrator suffered burn wounds on his hands and legs.

The attack is the deadliest mass murder in post-WW2 Czech history.

Fire 

Authorities received multiple phone calls about the fire at 17:46 and 47. At 17:49, the fire department dispatched units from Bohumín (one fire engine + one ladder truck), Karviná (two fire engines) and Orlová (one fire engine + one ladder truck). Furthermore, the dispatcher called volunteer units from Bohumín-Šunychl (ome fire engine) and Starý Bohumín (one fire engine) and a special high rise ladder truck from Ostrava.

The building was first reached by units from Bohumín and Starý Bohumín at 17:54 who immediately raced to the 11th floor to start rescue operations. Trucks from nearby Orlová reached the building at 18:01, volunteer units from Bohumín-Šunychl at 18:04 and units from 16 km-distant Karviná at 18:06. 28 firemen took part in the initial rescue operation, with more arriving afterwards for a total of 46 fire personnel with nine fire engines and three ladder trucks.

When firemen reached the building, the flat was already completely ablaze. Five people jumped out of a window to their deaths while a landing mattress was being prepared. The fire was under control at 18:30 and completely extinguished at 19:43.

Victims 
Six people were killed in the fire and five more from falling for a total of eleven fatalities. Nine people were rescued from other flats. Fifteen people needed medical attention, ten of them requiring transfer to a hospital. Among the injured were two firemen. A volunteer firefighter inhaled smoke and a professional firefighter suffered serious burns to the neck.

Media identified the following victims:
 Lukáš Konopka (30), perpetrator's son
 Dominik (9), perpetrator's grandson
 Lenka V. (30), perpetrator's soon-to-be daughter-in-law who was celebrating 30th birthday
 Silvia (53), perpetrator's estranged wife and Lukáš Konopka's mother
 Jana (73), perpetrator's mother-in-law
 Nikola G. (17, 8 months pregnant), Lenka V.'s sister, who fell out of the window after lengthy effort to hold onto its ledge
 Melinka (11)
 (four dead unidentified by media)

Wounded victims who managed to climb through balconies to neighbour's flat:
 Rostislav, who was in bathroom during initial blaze, suffered serious burns
 Žaneta, mother of victims Lenka and Nikola, who was with Rostislav in bathroom during initial blaze, suffered serious burns
 Jakub A., partner of victim Nikola
 Pavel

Perpetrator 
Police arrested 54-year-old Zdeněk Konopka in front of the building and two days later charged him with multiple murder and public endangerment.

According to the remand request filed by State Attorney Michal Król, the perpetrator had planned the attack in advance. He consumed alcohol in order to strengthen his resolve, filled two plastic bottles with gasoline at a nearby petrol station, and went to the flat with full knowledge of the birthday party that was taking place inside. The perpetrator stood in front of the entrance doors with open bottles of gasoline in each hand and rang the doorbell. A female, whose name was withheld in the publicly released remand request, opened the doors. Thereafter, the perpetrator threw one of the open bottles at the female victim, who reacted by slamming the doors shut. The perpetrator then poured the remaining gasoline onto the doors, with some of it pouring under the doors into the flat, and set it on fire. The perpetrator suffered burn wounds on his hands and legs. He went outside where he was confronted by the police and immediately arrested.

The Karviná district court ordered his remand on 11 August. If convicted, he may be sentenced to life imprisonment.

The perpetrator had four prior criminal convictions, two of them for violent crimes. He was known for aggressiveness as well as high consumption of alcohol. Several weeks before the arson attack, the perpetrator threatened his wife and son with a gas pistol at a nearby lake. Police didn't seek the perpetrator's remand at the time as the weapon used was not suitable to cause injury (the perpetrator could not legally possess a real firearm due to his criminal record, see Gun laws in the Czech Republic). After the incident, the perpetrator's wife moved to the son's flat. Police investigation into this incident was still open at the time of the arson attack.

Police response 
Initial investigations conducted by the police revealed that the fire was deliberately set and concluded the incident was an arson attack. The motive was said to be a conflict within the family. Police officials detained Konopka, who is accused in connection with the incident, and during an interview with Česká televize, regional police chief Tomáš Kužel compared the incident to the 2013 Frenštát pod Radhoštěm explosion which eventually killed seven people.

Sentencing 
On 30 November 2021, the County Court in Ostrava accepted a plea bargain concluded between the perpetrator and the State Attorney, under which the perpetrator admitted guilt and accepted a sentence of life imprisonment. In doing so, the perpetrator avoided a lengthy public court trial.

Other mass murders 

The attack is the worst mass murder in post-WW2 Czech history (see list of massacres). The January 2020 Vejprty care center fire was also started deliberately according to investigators, however no one has been charged with causing 8 deaths therein yet. Another attempted mass murder in Lenora in 2019 ended with only the arsonist's loss of life.

See also 

2009 Vítkov arson attack, another arson attack in the Czech Republic

References

External links

2020 disasters in the Czech Republic
2020 fires in Europe
2020 in the Czech Republic
Arson in the 2020s
Arson in the Czech Republic
August 2020 crimes in Europe
August 2020 events in the Czech Republic
Building and structure fires in the Czech Republic
Familicides
Karviná District
Mass murder in 2020
Mass murder in the Czech Republic
High-rise fires